Deposition by political means concerns the removal of a politician or monarch. It may be done by coup, impeachment, invasion, or forced abdication. The term may also refer to the official removal of a clergyman, especially a bishop, from ecclesiastical office.

Notable deposed politicians

Notable deposed monarchs

Notable deposed bishops
 Cyril of Alexandria
 Cyril Lucaris
 John Chrysostom
 Nestorius
 Photios I of Constantinople
 Antipope Benedict XIII
 Antipope John XXIII
 The Nine Bishops of the Nonjuring Schism
 Robert Duncan, VII Bishop of Pittsburgh
 Mark Lawrence, XIV Bishop of South Carolina
 John-David Schofield, IV Bishop of San Joaquin

See also
Coup d'état
Defrocking
Motion of no confidence

References

Changes in political power
People removed from office